"Call on Me" is a song co-written and produced by Swedish DJ and producer Eric Prydz. The song is based on a sample of Steve Winwood's 1982 song "Valerie" from the album Talking Back to the Night. "Call on Me" received significant sales success and topped several record charts. The song is known for its music video, which features several women (including Deanne Berry as the dance instructor) and a man performing aerobics in a sexually suggestive manner.

Background
"Call on Me" prominently features a sample of English singer-songwriter Steve Winwood's 1982 song "Valerie" from his album Talking Back to the Night. French duo Together, consisting of Daft Punk member Thomas Bangalter and producer DJ Falcon, had previously sampled "Valerie" as a live tool in a DJ set in 2002. Falcon stated that Ministry of Sound sent him a letter requesting that he release the track through the label. Despite the popularity and demand for it, Together did not consider it worth an official release. After the duo declined the request, Ministry of Sound would release the Prydz song without mention or credit to Together.

When Prydz sampled "Valerie" in 2004 and presented his track to Winwood, he was so impressed with it that he re-recorded the original sampled vocals. Winwood later recalled, "I quite liked it, I think he did a good job, I mean it's not exactly my cup of tea but, I liked what he did technically with it which is why I agreed to work with him on it a little bit".

Commercial performance
The song reached number one on the UK Singles Chart during a time when the chart was experiencing low sales due to the CD single facing increasing competition from the digital download, which at the time was not an eligible format in the chart. Until January 2005, Eric Prydz held the record for selling the lowest number of singles for a number-one chart position in the United Kingdom in any particular week: "Call on Me" sold 23,519 copies when it returned to the top of the charts on 17 October 2004. This record was broken once again by himself only a week later on 24 October 2004, with the single selling 21,749 copies that week. Nevertheless, it was the fourth-biggest-selling single of 2004 in the United Kingdom, selling 335,000 copies that year – including a DVD single with the uncut video – and staying five weeks at number-one on the UK Singles Chart, the longest run of any single that year.

The song entered the German Singles Chart at number one in early November 2004 and repeated this feat in Ireland. In Australia, "Call on Me" debuted and peaked at number two.

Music video
The music video for "Call on Me", directed by Huse Monfaradi, features an aerobics class of women wearing 1980s styled aerobics outfits performing sexually suggestive gym routines. The class is led by Australian dancer and choreographer Deanne Berry, who is wearing a leotard – much to the enjoyment of the sole man in the group, played by Argentine dancer/actor Juan Pablo Di Pace. The video was filmed at the Laban Dance Centre in Deptford, London, and imitates a scene from the 1985 film Perfect starring John Travolta and Jamie Lee Curtis.

In late 2004, while being interviewed by Chris Evans for UK Radio Aid, a 12-hour fundraising broadcast for tsunami victims, the then Prime Minister of the United Kingdom Tony Blair said: "The first time it came on, I nearly fell off my rowing machine." Vice Media via their Thump website would go on to call the video the "Sexiest Music Video of All Time". There are two versions—an edited one shown in daylight hours, and a late night version which is uncut and features the dancers rubbing their breasts and one dancer slapping her buttocks.

The video was the highest-downloaded music video of all time in Australia, downloaded over 35,000 times through 3 Mobile mobile phones with 3G technology in association with the Rage music television show. Ministry of Sound presented the 3 Mobile phone provider with the mobile equivalent of a gold record in April 2005.

Due to the popularity and high demand for the video, a feature-length aerobics DVD was later released, titled Pump It Up – The Ultimate Dance Workout, which featured the dancers from the "Call on Me" video performing aerobics routines to various popular dance music songs. On 8 January 2020, Ministry of Sound uploaded the DVD in its entirety to its YouTube channel.

In 2006, as tribute to the "Call on Me" video, a sequel was created with the same principal dancers in "The Hughes Corporation" house remix of Irene Cara's 1983 "Flashdance... What a Feeling". This video references the films Flashdance, Dirty Dancing, Saturday Night Fever and Grease as evidenced by the featured dance, costumes and film posters in the video.

In subsidiary roles as aerobics class members, the video features British dancers Laura More, Franky Wedge, Laura Jayne Smith, Rosy Hawkins and Laura Bowley.

The video ranked number 5 in NMEs "50 Worst Music Videos Ever".

In September 2014, eight Norwegian former and current cancer patients recreated the video to support the Aktiv mot Kreft foundation (Active Against Cancer, founded by Helle Aanesen and Grete Waitz) and promote physical training for cancer patients.

On 4 February 2020, the official Ministry of Sound YouTube channel uploaded an HD version of the "Late Night" video version.

Track listings

 Swedish, UK, and Australian CD single
 "Call on Me" (radio edit) – 2:57
 "Call on Me" (Eric Prydz vs Retarded Funk mix) – 7:36
 "Call on Me" (JJ Stockholm club mix) – 8:01
 "Call on Me" (Filterheadz remix) – 7:13
 "Call on Me" (Red Kult Dub Pass 2 mix) – 7:50

 Swedish and UK DVD single
 "Call on Me" (daytime version video)
 "Call on Me" (late night version video)
 "Call on Me" (radio edit audio)
 "Call on Me" (Eric Prydz vs. Retarded Funk mix audio)
 Photo gallery

 French CD single
 "Call on Me" (radio edit) – 2:49
 "Call on Me" (Eric Prydz vs Retarded Funk mix) – 7:33

 French DVD single
 "Call on Me" (dirty version video) – 2:53
 "Call on Me" (clean version video) – 2:53

 UK 12-inch single
A1. "Call on Me" (Eric Prydz vs Retarded Funk mix)
B1. "Call on Me" (Red Kult Dub Pass 2 mix)
B2. "Call on Me" (Filterheadz remix)

 US 12-inch single
A1. "Call on Me" (Eric Prydz vs Retarded Funk mix) – 7:33
A2. "Call on Me" (Filterheadz remix) – 7:05
B1. "Call on Me" (JJ Stockholm club remix) – 7:51
B2. "Call on Me" (Red Kult Dub Pass 2 mix) – 7:53

Charts

Weekly charts

Year-end charts

Decade-end charts

Certifications

Release history

References

2004 singles
2004 songs
Data Records singles
Eric Prydz songs
European Hot 100 Singles number-one singles
Irish Singles Chart number-one singles
Ministry of Sound singles
Music video controversies
Number-one singles in Austria
Number-one singles in Germany
Number-one singles in Norway
Number-one singles in Scotland
Number-one singles in Sweden
SNEP Top Singles number-one singles
Songs with lyrics by Will Jennings
Songs written by Eric Prydz
Songs written by Steve Winwood
UK Singles Chart number-one singles
Ultra Music singles